Dhordo is a small village located in Kutch district, Gujarat, India. This village is situated within Bhuj taluk on the edge of the India-Pakistan border and is around 86 KM from Bhuj. The village is home to an annual 3-month festival called 'Rann Utsav'.

References

Villages in Kutch district